Corissa Lee Yasen (December 5, 1973 – May 12, 2001) was an American collegiate and professional athlete.

She was born in Omaha, Nebraska, and attended high school in Coeur d'Alene, Idaho.

Yasen attended Purdue University and became a nine-time All-American and 10-time Big Ten Conference champion in track and field. She was Purdue's Female Athlete-of-the-Year as a junior and senior and was a Big Ten Medal of Honor winner, as well as Big Ten Athlete of the Year.  She also won the NCAA heptathlon title in 1996. Yasen also joined the Purdue women's basketball program, as a starter, during her final year of eligibility. She graduated in 1997 with a degree in pharmacy.

She went on to play for the Sacramento Monarchs in 1997, the inaugural year of the Women's National Basketball Association (WNBA). During the WNBA offseason, Yasen served as an assistant coach for a high school girls' basketball team in West Lafayette, Indiana when they won the state championship in 1998.

On May 12, 2001, she was found dead in her apartment in Coeur d'Alene. She had been working at a pharmacy in Hayden, Idaho. Her death was ruled as a suicide by an "acute multidrug overdose." A forensic autopsy performed by the Spokane County (Washington) coroner led to a panel of toxicology tests, which were conducted by the National Medical Services Laboratory in Willow Grove, Pennsylvania. High levels of diazepam, hydrocodone, lorazepam, fluoxetine and other drugs were found in the toxicology analysis.  Investigators also recovered substantial quantities of various intravenous drugs and narcotics in Yasen's residence.

Purdue statistics
Source

External links
 Rivals.com obituary

References 

1973 births
2001 deaths
2001 suicides
American women's basketball coaches
American women's basketball players
Basketball players from Nebraska
High school basketball coaches in the United States
Purdue Boilermakers women's basketball players
Sacramento Monarchs players
Small forwards
Sportspeople from Omaha, Nebraska
Drug-related suicides in Idaho
20th-century American women
20th-century American people